Protaetia is a genus of beetles of the family Scarabaeidae, occurring primarily in Asia, and containing over 300 species.

Selected species

Protaetia affinis (Andersch, 1797)
Protaetia afflicta (Gory & Percheron, 1833)
Protaetia alboguttata (Vigors, 1826)
Protaetia aurichalcea  (Fabricius, 1775)
Protaetia bipunctata (Gory & Percheron, 1833)
Protaetia brevitarsis (Lewis, 1879)
Protaetia conspersa Janson, 1877
Protaetia culta (Waterhouse, 1879)
Protaetia cuprea  (Fabricius, 1775)
Protaetia fieberi (Kraatz, 1880)
Protaetia fusca (Herbst, 1790)
Protaetia haiastanica Ghrejyan & Kalashian, 2017
Protaetia lewisi Janson, 1888
Protaetia lugubris (Herbst, 1786)
Protaetia mirifica (Mulsant, 1842)
Protaetia opaca  (Fabricius, 1787)
Protaetia orientalis (Gory & Percheron, 1833)
Protaetia regalis (Blanchard, 1842)
Protaetia speciosa (Adams, 1817)
Protaetia spectabilis (Schaum, 1841)
Protaetia ungarica (Herbst, 1790)

References

Biolib
 Robert E. Woodruf - The Asian mango flower beetle - INSECTA MUNDI, Vol. 20, No. 3-4, September–December, 2006

External links 
 Protaetia, the beautiful flower chafers, Natural History Museum
 Protaetia cuprea ignicollis in Israel: Photo 1 and Photo 2, Flickr

Cetoniinae